Santa Maria dei Miracoli presso San Celso is a church and a sanctuary in Milan, Lombardy, northern Italy.

History and overview
The construction was begun by Gian Giacomo Dolcebuono and Giovanni Battagio in 1493, to house a miraculous icon of the Madonna, initially on the central plan. The first part to be built was the octagonal dome, covered externally by a tambour with a loggia and arcades decorated by twelve brickwork statues by Agostino De Fondulis, designed in  Lombard style by Giovanni Antonio Amadeo (1494-1498).
In 1506 to the original edifice a complex with nave and two aisles was added, the former covered by a monumental barrel vault also by Amadeo; the presbytery received a polygonal ambulatory inspired to that in the Duomo.

In the 16th century also the square portico in classical style was added, perhaps designed by Cesare Cesariano or Cristoforo Lombardo (il Lombardino). The massive eclectic and Mannerist style façade was designed by Galeazzo Alessi in the late 16th century and was realized by Martino Bassi; it is decorated by numerous statues and reliefs by Stoldo Lorenzi and Annibale Fontana.

From 1595 the organist was the keyboard virtuoso Giovanni Paolo Cima.

Interior
The interior houses numerous works by Milanese Renaissance and Baroque artists: Giovan Battista Crespi (il Cerano), Camillo and Giulio Cesare Procaccini, Carlo Francesco Nuvolone, Antonio Campi, Bergognone, Callisto Piazza and others. Notable are the Baptism of Jesus by Gaudenzio Ferrari and Giovan Battista della Cerva, the Fall of St. Paul by Moretto and, on the altar of the right transept, an altarpiece by Paris Bordone. The lectern of the choir is by Giuseppe Meda.

In the left transept, within an altar designed by Martino Bassi, is the venerated marble statue of the Assunta by Annibale Fontana (1586) with two later angels by Giulio Cesare Procaccini.

San Celso
Annexed to Santa Maria is the Romanesque church of San Celso, dedicated to the martyr Saint Celsus, which was largely demolished. It was founded in the 4th century and rebuilt in the 11th century.

The façade (remade in the 19th century) has a rose window and a Romanesque portal with animal figures decoration. Also from the 11th century is the bell tower.

See also
 History of early modern period domes

Notes

16th-century Roman Catholic church buildings in Italy
Maria presso San Celso
Renaissance architecture in Milan
Tourist attractions in Milan
Basilica churches in Milan